R. Vaithilingam is an Indian politician and an ex- Rajya Sabha member from the state of Tamil Nadu. He is now present Member of legislative assembly from Orathanad constituency in the state assembly election of 2021.

Vaithilingam was Minister for Housing and Urban Development in the Government of Tamil Nadu prior to his defeat by M. Ramachandran in the state assembly election of 2016. The defeat was described as a giant-killing outcome. As a cadre of the All India Anna Dravida Munnetra Kazhagam (AIADMK), he had been elected to the Tamil Nadu Legislative Assembly from the Orathanad constituency in 2001, 2006 and 2011.

On 3 June 2016, he was elected unopposed to the Rajya Sabha, along with three others of his party.

Expulsion from AIADMK
On 11 July 2022, R. Vaithilingam along with O. Panneerselvam were expelled as primary members of the party for "anti-party" activities by the AIADMK General Council.

References 

Tamil Nadu MLAs 2001–2006
Tamil Nadu MLAs 2006–2011
Tamil Nadu MLAs 2011–2016
All India Anna Dravida Munnetra Kazhagam politicians
Living people
State cabinet ministers of Tamil Nadu
Rajya Sabha members from Tamil Nadu
Year of birth missing (living people)
Tamil Nadu MLAs 2021–2026